Affärsvärlden (Swedish for "Business world") is a Swedish language weekly business magazine published in Stockholm, Sweden.

History and profile
Affärsvärlden was founded in January 1901. Its former publisher was Ekonomi och Teknik Förlag AB. The magazine is published weekly by Affärsvärlden Förlag AB, which is a subsidiary of Talentum Sweden AB. The magazine is based in Stockholm.

Affärsvärlden merged with another business magazine Finanstidningen in 1964. However, the merge was not a success in terms of circulation in that it could only achieve a circulation of four to five thousand copies. In 2002  Affärsvärlden acquired the editorial office of Ekonomi24, an internet-based economy news agency founded in 1999.

The target audience of the magazine is investors and decision-makers in large and medium-sized enterprises.

Emil Fitger served as the editor-in-chief of Affärsvärlden from 1914 to 1953. Göran Lind is the editor-in-chief of the magazine.

In 2004 the circulation of Affärsvärlden was 14,700 copies. The magazine sold 26,200 copies in 2008.

See also
 List of magazines in Sweden

References

External links
Official website

1901 establishments in Sweden
Magazines established in 1901
Magazines published in Stockholm
Business magazines published in Sweden
Swedish-language magazines
Weekly magazines published in Sweden